The Ubud Palace, officially Puri Saren Agung, is a historical building complex situated in Ubud, Gianyar Regency of Bali, Indonesia.

The palace was the official residence of the royal family of Ubud. It was on his travels that Rsi Markandya received a divine revelation that in Bali he was to bury five precious metals on a mountain slope where the mother temple of Besakih now stands today. Along with a group of followers, Rsi Markandya was magnetically attracted to a destination located in the central foothills of the island that radiated light and energy. This place was Campuhan in Ubud at a junction in the Wos River and it was here that he felt compelled to build a temple by the name of Pura Gunung Lebah.

On subsequent expeditions around Bali, Rsi Markandya built a number of other significant temples and created a shared irrigation system for the terraced landscape that is still practiced by farmers today. The formation of the banjar, which is a village council responsible for community and religious affairs, was also inspired by Rsi Markandya. In essence, it can be said that Rsi Markandya is responsible for the foundation of Balinese Hinduism in its purest form referred to as Agama Tirtha or the religion of holy water.

Since being discovered back in the 8th century, the area of Campuhan has always been highly regarded by the Balinese for its immense spiritual powers. Even the term Ubud is derived from the term ubad, meaning medicine in reference to the traditional healing properties of the array of plants that randomly grow here. Generations of Hindu worshippers have made special pilgrimages to the fork in the Wos River to mediate, bathe and collect holy water for temple ceremonies and cleansing rituals.

There had always been ties between Java and Bali, but it was the disintegration of the once mighty Majapahit Empire in the 15th century that saw a mass exodus of nobles to Bali. A new kingdom on the island's east coast called Gelgel was consequently established and gave sanctuary to many important ruling families. They brought with them an artistic legacy and the principles of the caste system.

By the 17th century Bali invariably experienced a rapid emergence of new kingdoms, including the founding of several royal houses in Ubud. However, this period also saw much conflict between the royal clans with supremacy as the ultimate goal. A prince from Klungkung was sent to create a palace in Sukawati as a centre of great power and aesthetic beauty. Artisans came from all over Bali to help in its construction and once completed many of them chose to stay. Sukawati today is a community that strongly supports all forms of artistry as well as dance and music.

With the successful establishment of a reigning authority in Sukawati, palace retainers were then sent in the late 1700s to secure the area of Ubud. A pair of cousins formed rival communities in Padang Tegal and further north in the area of Taman. Following subsequent fighting between these neighbouring villages the king of Sukawati sent his brothers Tjokorde Ngurah Tabanan to Peliatan and Tjokorde Tangkeban to Sambahan to establish palaces with the notion to control these troubled areas.

See also 
 Klungkung Palace

External links

Ubud Palace official website

Tourist attractions in Bali
Precolonial states of Indonesia
Palaces in Bali
Ubud